Eldar Quliyev (January 18, 1941 – April 16, 2021) was a Soviet and Azerbaijani film director, screenwriter, and actor.

Biography
Eldar was the son of composer and pianist Tofig Guliyev. He studied at the Gerasimov Institute of Cinematography from 1960 to 1966, where he was taught by Sergei Gerasimov himself. He then began working for the film studio Azerbaijanfilm in 1967, where he directed fictional films and documentaries. He also became a professor of cinematography at the Azerbaijan State University of Culture and Arts. That year, he directed his first short film, titled .

Eldar Quliyev died in Baku on 16 April 2021 at the age of 80.

Filmography
Bir cənub şəhərində (1969)
Var olun, qızlar... (1972)
Səmt küləy (1975)
 (1976)
 (1977)
Babek (1979)
Nizami (1982)
Gümüşgöl əfsanəsi (1985)
Burulğan (1987)
 (1989)
 (1992)
 (2005)
 (2005)
 (2006)
 (2010)
 (2013)

Awards
 (1976)
 (1978)
Order of the Red Banner of Labour (1980)
 (1982)
Shohrat Order (2001)
Sharaf Order (2011)
Honorary Diploma of President (2016)
 (2018)
Istiglal Order (2021)

References

1941 births
2021 deaths
20th-century Azerbaijani male actors
20th-century screenwriters
21st-century Azerbaijani male actors
21st-century screenwriters
Actors from Baku
Film people from Baku
Academic staff of the Azerbaijan State University of Culture and Arts
Gerasimov Institute of Cinematography alumni
Honored Art Workers of the Azerbaijan SSR
People's Artists of the Azerbaijan SSR
Recipients of the Order of the Red Banner of Labour
Recipients of the Istiglal Order
Recipients of the Sharaf Order
Recipients of the Shohrat Order
Azerbaijani film directors
Azerbaijani male film actors
Azerbaijani screenwriters
Soviet film directors
Soviet male film actors
Soviet screenwriters